Cappelle sul Tavo is a comune and town in the Province of Pescara in the Abruzzo region of Italy.

History
Cappelle sul Tavo has been an independent municipality since 1906. Previously, it was part of the municipality of Montesilvano.

The name probably derives from a number of small "cappelle" (chapels) among the woods. The name "Cappelle" also appears in documents of the 11th and 12th centuries and is represented in the emblem of the town, showing two Gothic chapels.

References

Cities and towns in Abruzzo